Bhilomar is a village and union council, an administrative subdivision, of the Chakwal District in the Punjab Province of Pakistan. It is part of Talagang Tehsil and is located at 32°44'0N 72°26'0E. A majority of the population belongs to the Awan tribe.

Bhilomar is the hometown of Maj Gen Asad Mehmud Malik  and his wife Shahida Malik, who is the first female general in Pakistan's history. They are the first Asian couple who are both generals and doctors in the Pakistan Armed Forces. They Belong to the Awan tribe of the village.
The endless efforts of this couple brought Bhillomar to the status of Model Village in 2007. H/Capt Ghulam Jaffar TK-I, Col. Ghulam Baqer and Superintendent Rangers Muhammad Farooq Bhatti of Chhab also belong to this village. Dr. Mudassar Hussain first Ph. D in Pharmacoeconomics belong to this village he is son of Haji Noor Hussain Member District Council of Chakwal and Ex. Manager Civil Aviation Authority Karachi Air Port.
There are two high schools each for boys and girls, one Health Center, Two Imam Bargah (Bab-e-Imran and Gharbi Imam Bargah) and one Union Council office.

References 

Muhammad farooq bhatti

Union councils of Chakwal District